Serra de Paüls is a mountain range in the northern side of the Ports de Tortosa-Beseit, Catalonia, Spain. The highest summit, Punta de l'Aigua has an elevation of 1,091.6 metres above sea level.

Geography
The central part of the range is known as Montsagre de Paüls.

This range is named after the town of Paüls, located on its SE side. Together with neighboring and parallel Serra de l'Espina the Serra de Paüls
is within the geological area that connects the Ports de Tortosa-Beseit mountain massif with the Catalan Pre-Coastal Range.

See also
Ports de Tortosa-Beseit
Mountains of Catalonia
Iberian System

References

External links

 Excursió al Montsagre de Paüls
Dadescat
Bolós i Vigo - Alyssum montanum

Ports de Tortosa-Beseit
Pauls
Terra Alta (comarca)
Baix Ebre